Nurole Ltd is an online technology company based in London, United Kingdom. It operates a digital platform where members can see board-level vacancies, for which they can apply or recommend others. Nurole is available to businesses to obtain access to a pool of potential candidates, said to number over 30,000 across 100 countries. Members are matched to opportunities on the platform, including both paid and unpaid rôles in the private, public and charitable sectors. 

In 2018, Nurole won the Digital Startup of the Year Award at the Digital Entrepreneur Awards. In 2019 it was placed 81st in the Financial Times' annual list of Europe's fastest-growing companies, and featured again in 2020.

History 
Nurole was founded in 2014 by Susie Cummings. Cummings is the sister of Nicholas Wheeler, the founder of Charles Tyrwhitt. She previously founded Blackwood Group, an executive search firm with a focus on financial services and private equity.

Awards 

 2020 - The FT 1000 (Europe) - 104th Place
2019 - The FT 1000 (Europe) - 81st Place
 2018 - Digital Entrepreneur Awards - Digital Startup of the Year
 2016 - City A.M. - 50 Hottest UK Tech Startups

References 

British companies established in 2014
Executive search firms